Syed Tahir Hussain Mashhadi (July 26, 1942 - July 9, 2022) was a Pakistani soldier and politician.

Military career
Tahir Mashhadi joined the Pakistan Army in 1970 during the war with India and was commissioned as a second lieutenant in 1971, graduating from the Pakistan Military Academy.

During the Indo-Pakistani War of 1971, Mashhadi was stationed in then East Pakistan, which saw some heavy air attacks. At the end of war, Mashadi was taken as a prisoner of war and repatriated in 1974.

He was a member of the Pakistan Peoples Party and a former senator of the Muttahida Qaumi Movement.

References

Pakistan Army officers
Living people
1942 births
Muttahida Qaumi Movement politicians
Pakistani senators (14th Parliament)